The 1929 Wellington City mayoral election was part of the New Zealand local elections held that same year. In 1929, elections were held for the Mayor of Wellington plus other local government positions including fifteen councillors. The polling was conducted using the standard first-past-the-post electoral method.

Background
George Troup, the incumbent Mayor, was re-elected to office as Mayor of Wellington, defeating Walter Nash who was his sole opponent.

Mayoralty results

Councillor results

References

External links
Photos of the Mayor and Councillors elected in 1929

Mayoral elections in Wellington
1929 elections in New Zealand
Politics of the Wellington Region
1920s in Wellington